Narpatganj is a town and municipal headquarter of Narpatganj (community development block) of Forbesganj subdivision in the Araria district of Bihar state, India.

Geography
Narpatganj is  municipal headquarter of Narpatganj (community development block), one of the 9 blocks in Araria district.

Location
National Highway 57 passes through Narpatganj. Nearest airport is Bagdogra airport.and. Darbhanga airport

Administration and politics
Narpatganj (Vidhan Sabha constituency) is the assembly constituency for the city. Jai Prakash Yadav (BJP) elected in 2020 is the MLA.

Transport
Nearest airport is Bagdogra (IXB) which is approximately 175 KM.

References

External links
 About Narpatganj
 Natpatganj News

Cities and towns in Araria district